Bunmi Kayode  (born 13 April 1985) is a Nigerian women's international footballer who plays as a defender. She is a member of the Nigeria women's national football team. She was part of the team at the 2003 FIFA Women's World Cup.

References

1985 births
Living people
Nigerian women's footballers
Nigeria women's international footballers
Place of birth missing (living people)
2003 FIFA Women's World Cup players
Women's association football defenders
Yoruba sportswomen